Pteria was a town of ancient Paphlagonia, inhabited from Classical through Byzantine times.

Its site is tentatively located near Eğrikale, Asiatic Turkey.

References

Populated places in ancient Paphlagonia
Former populated places in Turkey
Roman towns and cities in Turkey
Populated places of the Byzantine Empire
History of Samsun Province